Robin Victory in Europe Strasser (born May 7, 1945) is an American actress, best known for her role as Dorian Lord on the ABC daytime soap opera One Life to Live.

Life and career 
Strasser's middle name is a tribute to her being born the day Germany surrendered in World War II. She was born in the New York City borough of the Bronx and raised in Manhattan by Martin and Anne Strasser who were both Jewish. After graduating from the High School of Performing Arts, on full scholarship, she attended the Yale University School of Drama. She began acting in the early 1960s. Strasser sharpened her acting abilities in theatre, acting on Broadway, where she appeared in The Shadow Box and Chapter Two. Early in her stage career she met her first husband, Laurence Luckinbill; they were married in 1965 and divorced in 1976. They have two sons, Nicholas and Ben. Strasser was also married to Richard Hogan from August 27, 1983, until 1985.

She is a founding member of the American Conservatory Theater, and began her extensive daytime career in 1964. Her first role was as Iris on The Secret Storm. In 1967, she originated the role of Rachel Davis Matthews on NBC's Another World. After leaving the role of Rachel, Strasser played Dr. Christina Karras Martin on All My Children. 

Strasser was offered the role of Cathy Craig on One Life to Live, but ended up joining the show as Dorian Lord in 1979, when Claire Malis left the role. Dorian became a role for which Strasser became well known. Strasser had two stints as Dorian, leaving the show in 1987 and returning to play Dorian again from 1993 to 2000, 2003 to August 25, 2011, and then again in the online revival of the series in 2013. From 2001 to 2002, she appeared as 300-year-old witch Hecuba on the NBC serial Passions. In 2019 she played Vivian Alamain on Days of Our Lives for 15 episodes.

Strasser won a Daytime Emmy Award for Outstanding Actress in a Daytime Drama Series in 1982 for her portrayal of Dorian, and was also nominated for the award in 1981, 1983, and 1985. Strasser has been nominated for Soap Opera Digest Awards for Dorian in various categories in 1986, 1988, 1994, 1995 and 2005, winning in 1996 ("Outstanding Lead Actress" for Dorian) and 2001 ("Outstanding Female Scene Stealer" for Hecuba).

Strasser was an Honorary Chair of the Imperial Court of New York's Annual Charity Coronation Ball, "Night of A Thousand Gowns," on March 21, 2009. She was previously made a Dame of the Imperial Court of New York in March 2007, and attended the 2008 "Night of A Thousand Gowns."

Filmography

References

External links

1945 births
Living people
20th-century American actresses
21st-century American actresses
Actresses from New York (state)
American stage actresses
American television actresses
American soap opera actresses
Daytime Emmy Award winners
Daytime Emmy Award for Outstanding Lead Actress in a Drama Series winners
Yale School of Drama alumni
Yale University alumni
People from Brooklyn
People from the Bronx